CMCT may refer to:
 1-Cyclohexyl-(2-Morpholinoethyl)Carbodiimide metho-p-Toluene sulfonate: a chemical used in structure probing of nucleic acids
Central motor conduction time